Buffalo Township is a township in Morgan County, in the U.S. state of Missouri.

Buffalo Township takes its name from Big Buffalo Creek.

References

Townships in Missouri
Townships in Morgan County, Missouri